Agudo is a municipality in Rio Grande do Sul, the southernmost state of Brazil.

Location

Agudo is 83 meters above sea level. The total area is 553,1 km² and the population was estimated at 16,401 in 2020.

The municipality contains part of the  Quarta Colônia State Park, created in 2005.
The municipality contains part of the hydroelectric Dona Francisca Dam on the upper Jacuí River.

History

Archeological evidence indicates that this area was settled by humankind as far back as 8,000 years ago.

The first Europeans to come into the area were Jesuit priests who in the 16th century began establishing the so-called Reductions or Missions as they also were named in the wider region (i.e. Brazil, Argentina and Paraguay).

At a later date with the expulsion of the Jesuit order by both the Spanish and Portuguese crowns from South America left the area inactive as far as European activities were concerned.

The local indigenous population suffered attacks by Paulistas from the north who, amongst other things, made it their business to capture Indians to be put up for sale in the slave markets of São Paulo, etc...

In 1857 a new wave of immigration started to affect the region, this time attracting Germanic settlers and subsequently peoples of other European origins. The German language is still spoken by some residents of the Municipality of Agudo and in areas around it.

In 2001 a fossil of a dinosaur was found in Agudos and after the analysis of its skeleton, it was reported to be a new species of ornithischian dinosaur, named sacisaur (Sacisaurus agudoensis) after the evidence that the skeleton missed the bones of one of its leg.

References

External links
 The Municipality of Agudo. Official website, accessed on April 25, 2006.

Genealogical research
 Colônia Santo Ângelo/Santo Angelo Settlement (Archived 2009-10-24). Site in English and Portuguese, accessed on April 25, 2006.
 Altmann Family. Site in English and in Portuguese, accessed on April 25, 2006.
 Projeto Imigração Alemã/German Immigration Project. Site in Portuguese, accessed on April 25, 2006.
 The Beskow Family in Santo Ângelo, in the Municipality of Agudo (Archived 2009-10-24). Site in English and Portuguese, accessed on April 25, 2006.

Municipalities in Rio Grande do Sul